Ice is a 2008 novel by Australian novelist Louis Nowra.

Plot summary
A pair of ambitious young British entrepreneurs, Malcolm McEacharn and Andrew McIlwraith, charter a steamer with the aim of towing an iceberg from Antarctica to Sydney. The success of the venture transforms Sydney, and McEacharn who later becomes lord mayor of Melbourne.

Notes
 Dedication: For Mandy

Reviews
 The Australian
 Readings

Awards and nominations
 2009 shortlisted Miles Franklin Literary Award 
 2009 Prime Minister's Literary Awards — Highly Commended

References 

2008 Australian novels
Allen & Unwin books